Pompiliodes is a genus of moths in the subfamily Arctiinae. The genus was erected by George Hampson in 1898.

Species
 Pompiliodes acroleuca Zerny, 1931
 Pompiliodes albomarginata (Druce, 1884)
 Pompiliodes aliena Walker, 1854
 Pompiliodes obliqua Hampson, 1914
 Pompiliodes postica Walker, 1856
 Pompiliodes tenebrosa Walker, 1854

References

Arctiinae